Dinky line (or simply "Dinky") is a nickname sometimes used to describe a short railroad line, usually operated with short trains.  The term may come from "dinkey", which is "a small locomotive for hauling cars, shunting, etc. in a railroad yard" and is driven by "Rail Yard Engineers, Dinkey Operators, and Hostlers".

The following have been called dinky lines:

The Ames and College Railway, a steam train line from 1891 through 1907 linking Ames, Iowa with Iowa Agricultural College
The B&O Main Line around Sykesville, MD, called both the "Dinkey" and the "Dinky."
Chicago and Tomah Railroad in Wisconsin, later a branch of the C&NW. Particularly the section between Fennimore and Woodman which was retained as a narrow gauge operation until its closure.
Columbia-Liberty Iron Company in Woodstock, Virginia
Cynwyd Line, Southeastern Pennsylvania Transportation Authority
Mount Airy and Eastern Railroad was a narrow gauge (3-foot) railroad connecting Mount Airy, North Carolina with Kibler Valley in Patrick County, Virginia from 1899 to 1918, a distance of 19.25 miles along the Ararat River.  A quarry line joined at "the Junction" near Riverside Drive.
New Canaan Branch, Metro-North Railroad
Orlando and Winter Park Railway
Princeton Branch, New Jersey Transit
St. Louis and Alton Railroad, between Alton and Grafton, IL, operated by Illinois Terminal.